Dead Men's Morris is a 1936 mystery detective novel by the British writer Gladys Mitchell. It is the seventh in her long-running series featuring the psychoanalyst and amateur detective Mrs Bradley. It was the first to be published by Michael Joseph who released all the subsequent fifty nine novels in the series. It was later republished with the alternative title Death Comes at Christmas.

Synopsis
Mrs Bradley goes to spend Christmas at her nephew's Oxfordshire pig farm, she investigates two apparently accidental deaths in the picturesque villages that are in fact murders. Also encountered are a legendary local ghost and a team of morris dancers.

References

Bibliography
 Klein, Kathleen Gregory. Great Women Mystery Writers: Classic to Contemporary. Greenwood Press, 1994.
 Miskimmin, Esme. 100 British Crime Writers. Springer Nature, 2020.
 Reilly, John M. Twentieth Century Crime & Mystery Writers. Springer, 2015.

1936 British novels
Novels by Gladys Mitchell
British crime novels
British mystery novels
British thriller novels
Novels set in Oxfordshire
British detective novels
Michael Joseph books